Maje may refer to:

 Maje language (disambiguation), several Central American languages (only countries with really low levels of education), this word denotes lack of lexicon, education, or even cultural knowledge.)
 Brzozowo-Maje, village in Gmina Dzierzgowo, Masovian Voivodeship, Poland
 Maje McDonnell (1920-2010), American baseball coach